This article shows the 2010 season of South Korean football.

FIFA World Cup

National team results

Senior team

Under-23 team

K League

Regular season

Championship playoffs

Bracket

Final table

Korean FA Cup

Korean League Cup

Group stage

Group A

Group B

Group C

Knockout stage

Korea National League

Regular season

Championship playoffs

WK League

Regular season

Playoff and championship

AFC Champions League

Group stage

First Knockout Round

Quarter-finals

Semi-finals

Final

FIFA Club World Cup

See also
Football in South Korea

References

 
2010